Jim Wells (born in Auckland, New Zealand) is a former motorcycle speedway rider in National League (speedway) and British League.

Career
Jim Wells is best known as a Sunderland Stars rider, where he rode for three seasons. 1973 saw him pick up some replacement riders with British League teams Cradley Heathens and Halifax but he never did more at that level. In 1974, he very briefly held the track record at Sunderland in a time of 63.4, but it was quickly beaten by Birmingham Brummies John Hart in 63.2.
A transfer to Stoke Potters in 1975 saw him have a good season but he was to move on in 1976 with the same promoter, Harry Bastable to the newly reformed Oxford Cheetahs with Stoke teammate, Steve Holden he had his last race at Oxford before retiring

After Speedway
Jim Wells raced Bangers (a lesser form of stockcar racing) for three years. Before returning to New Zealand, he worked on the North Sea gas pipeline in Scotland. Back home, he worked in a car dealership.
Married to Patricia, they have two children and three grandchildren.

References

External links
 https://wwosbackup.proboards.com/ 
 http://www.defunctspeedway.co.uk/Sunderland.htm
 http://speedwayplus.com/SunderlandHistory.shtml

1951 births
New Zealand motorcycle racers
new Zealand speedway riders
Oxford Cheetahs riders
Sunderland Stars riders
Stoke Potters riders
Berwick Bandits riders
Living people